Ángel Nahuel Gómez (born 23 August 1996) is an Argentine footballer who plays as a defender for Agropecuario.

Career
Local side Defensores de Belgrano was Gómez's first team, which preceded him signing for Rosario Central on 7 April 2004 - he was moved into the senior squad thirteen years later. After being an unused substitute six times between December 2017 and April 2018, he made his professional debut against Belgrano in the Primera División on 7 April 2018. Gómez made two more appearances during 2017–18, including one in the 2018 Copa Sudamericana versus São Paulo on 12 April 2018. In December, Gómez terminated his contract with the club. A month later, Agropecuario of Primera B Nacional completed the signing of Gómez.

Career statistics
.

References

External links

1996 births
Living people
People from Rosario Department
Argentine footballers
Association football defenders
Argentine Primera División players
Rosario Central footballers
Club Agropecuario Argentino players
Sportspeople from Santa Fe Province